Thikra or Zekra Muhammed Jaber Alwash  was the mayor of Baghdad from February 2015 until September 2020, superseding Naim Aboub al-Kaabi, and preceding Manhal Al Habbobi. Alwach has a Bachelor in engineering from Baghdad University of Technology, a Master in construction project management from University of Baghdad and a PhD in construction project management from Baghdad University of Technology. She started her career in 1993 as an engineer in construction projects and was responsible for administrative responsibilities until she was appointed director general of the Ministry of Higher Education, and is regarded as highly skilled technocrat. Alwach reported directly to the former Prime Minister, Haider al-Abadi. In her only interview with an English-language publication Alwach talked about the challenges of governing a war-torn city, the weight of responsibility she feels to succeed and the struggle for women’s rights in Iraq. She was married to Major General Ali Araji.

References

External links
Zekra Alwach becomes Baghdad's first female mayor
Baghdad set to get first female mayor 
Baghdad's first female mayor set to take the reins

Living people
Year of birth missing (living people)
Z
21st-century Iraqi women politicians
21st-century Iraqi politicians
Women in Iraq
University of Technology, Iraq alumni
People from Babil Governorate